The Ahmedabad–Sultanpur Weekly Express is an express train belonging to Western Railway zone that runs between  and  in India. It is currently being operated with 19403/19404 train numbers on a weekly basis.

Service

The 19403/Ahmedabad–Sultanpur Weekly Express has an average speed of 52 km/hr and covers 1561 km in 30h. The 19404/Sultanpur–Ahmedabad Weekly Express has an average speed of 52 km/hr and covers 1561 km in 30h.

Route and halts 

The important halts of the train are :

Coach composition

The train has standard LHB rakes with max speed of 110 kmph. The train consists of 19 coaches:

 1 AC II Tier
 2 AC III Tier
 9 Sleeper coaches
 5 General Unreserved
 2 Seating cum Luggage Rake

Traction

Both trains are hauled by a Vatva Loco Shed-based WDM-3A or WDM-3 diesel locomotive from Ahmedabad to Varanasi and vice versa.

Rake sharing

The train shares its rake with 19421/19422 Ahmedabad–Patna Weekly Express, 19409/19410 Ahmedabad–Gorakhpur Express.

See also 

 Ahmedabad Junction railway station
 Sultanpur Junction railway station
 Ahmedabad–Patna Weekly Express
 Ahmedabad–Lucknow Weekly Express
 Ahmedabad–Varanasi Weekly Express
 Ahmedabad–Gorakhpur Express

References

Notes

External links 

19403/Ahmedabad–Sultanpur Weekly Express India Rail Info
19404/Sultanpur–Ahmedabad Weekly Express India Rail Info

Rail transport in Gujarat
Rail transport in Rajasthan
Rail transport in Uttar Pradesh
Transport in Ahmedabad
Transport in Sultanpur, Uttar Pradesh
Express trains in India
Railway services introduced in 2011